Marcelo Rosado Carrasco (born 2 October 1978 in Málaga) is a 5-a-side football player from Spain.  He has a disability: he is blind and is a B1 type sportsperson.  He played 5-per-team football at the 2004 Summer Paralympics.  His team finished third after they played Greece and, won 2–0. He played 5-per-team football at the 2012 Summer Paralympics.  His team finished third after they played Argentina and, won 1-0 in a penalty shoot out. Rosado took one of the penalty shots but missed. The bronze medal game was watched by Infanta Elena and President of the Spanish Paralympic Committee. In the team's opening game against Great Britain, the game ended in a 1–1 draw.

He competed in the 2010 World Championships where he represented Spain.   In 2011, he represented Spain in the Turkey hosted European Championships.  His team was faced Turkey, Russia and Greece in the group stage.

He was a member of the national team in 2013 and competed in the European Championships.  The team faced Russia, Greece and France in the group stage.  His team won their opener against Russia.  His team went on to defeat France and finish first in the competition.

In 2013, he was awarded the bronze Real Orden al Mérito Deportivo.

References

External links 
 
 

1973 births
Living people
Paralympic 5-a-side footballers of Spain
Paralympic bronze medalists for Spain
5-a-side footballers at the 2004 Summer Paralympics
5-a-side footballers at the 2012 Summer Paralympics
5-a-side footballers at the 2016 Summer Paralympics
Medalists at the 2004 Summer Paralympics
Medalists at the 2012 Summer Paralympics
Visually impaired category Paralympic competitors
Sportspeople from Málaga
Paralympic medalists in football 5-a-side